The 1980 National Revenue Tennis Classic, also known as the Buckeye Championships, was a men's tennis tournament played on outdoor hardcourts at the Buckeye Boys Ranch in Grove City, a suburb of Columbus, Ohio in the United States that was part of the 1980 Volvo Grand Prix circuit. It was the 11th edition of the tournament and was held  from August 4 through August 10, 1980. Seventh-seeded Bob Lutz won the singles title, his second at the event after the inaugural edition in 1970.

Finals

Singles
 Bob Lutz defeated  Terry Rocavert 6–4, 6–3
 It was Lutz' 1st singles title of the year and the 9th of his career.

Doubles
 Brian Gottfried /  Sandy Mayer defeated  Peter Fleming /  Brian Teacher 6–4, 6–2

References

External links
 ITF tournament edition details

Buckeye Tennis Championships
Buckeye Tennis Championships
Buckeye Tennis Championships
Buckeye Tennis Championships